ORG-201745 is a progestin which was originated by Organon and was under development by Schering-Plough (which acquired Organon in 2007) for the treatment of "female genital diseases" and as a hormonal contraceptive for the prevention of pregnancy but was never marketed.

References

Abandoned drugs
Drugs with undisclosed chemical structures
Hormonal contraception
Progestogens